1308 Halleria, provisional designation , is a carbonaceous Charis asteroid from the outer regions of the asteroid belt, approximately 43 kilometers in diameter. It was discovered on 12 March 1931, by German astronomer Karl Reinmuth at the Heidelberg-Königstuhl State Observatory. The asteroid was named after Albrecht von Haller a Swiss physician, botanist and poet.

Orbit and classification 

Halleria belongs to the carbonaceous Charis family, a family of more than 800 members, named after its parent body 627 Charis. It orbits the Sun in the outer main-belt at a distance of 2.87–2.94 AU once every 4 years and 12 months (1,812 days; semi-major axis 2.91 AU). Its orbit has an eccentricity of 0.01 and an inclination of 6° with respect to the ecliptic.

The body's observation arc begins with its official discovery observation in March 1931.

Physical characteristics 

Halleria is an assumed carbonaceous C-type asteroid, which agrees with the overall spectral type for members of the Charis family.

Rotation period 

Between 2005 and 2011, three rotational lightcurves of Halleria were obtained from photometric observations by Donald Pray, René Roy, and Pierre Antonini. Lightcurve analysis gave a consolidated rotation period of 6.028 hours with a brightness amplitude between 0.14 and 0.17 magnitude.

Diameter and albedo 

According to the surveys carried out by the Infrared Astronomical Satellite IRAS, the Japanese Akari satellite and the NEOWISE mission of NASA's Wide-field Infrared Survey Explorer, Halleria measures between 39.33 and 50.046 kilometers in diameter and its surface has an albedo between 0.0338 and 0.05.

The Collaborative Asteroid Lightcurve Link derives an albedo of 0.0415 and a diameter of 43.13 kilometers based on an absolute magnitude of 10.9.

Naming 

This minor planet was named for Albrecht von Haller (1708–1777) a Swiss physician, botanist and poet. The naming took place during the 1935 meeting of the Astronomische Gesellschaft in Bern, Switzerland. The author of the Dictionary of Minor Planet Names learned about the naming circumstances from Dutch astronomer Ingrid van Houten-Groeneveld.

Notes

References

External links 
 Asteroid Lightcurve Database (LCDB), query form (info )
 Dictionary of Minor Planet Names, Google books
 Asteroids and comets rotation curves, CdR – Observatoire de Genève, Raoul Behrend
 Discovery Circumstances: Numbered Minor Planets (1)-(5000) – Minor Planet Center
 
 

001308
Discoveries by Karl Wilhelm Reinmuth
Named minor planets
19310312